Mas Flow may refer to:
 Mas Flow (album), an album by Luny Tunes
 Mas Flow Inc., a record label founded by Luny Tunes